Sutton Park may refer to the following places:

England 
 Sutton Park, West Midlands
 Sutton Park line
 Sutton Park railway station
 Sutton Park, North Yorkshire
 Sutton Park, Surrey

Elsewhere 
 Sutton Park, Dublin, a housing development in Bayside, Dublin, Ireland
 Sutton Park School, a school in Sutton, Dublin, Ireland
 Sutton Park Shopping Center in Streamwood, Illinois, USA

See also

 HM Prison East Sutton Park